Li Xudong (Chinese: 李旭东; born 9 February 1991 in Dalian) is a Chinese football player who currently plays for Chinese club Dalian LFTZ Huayi.

Club career
In 2010, Li Xudong started his professional footballer career with Dalian Yiteng in the China League Two. He would see the club move to Harbin and be an integral member of the squad as they moved up divisions and gained promotion to the Chinese Super League. He would eventually make his top tier league debut for Harbin on 7 March 2014 in a game against Shandong Luneng Taishan that ended in a 1-0 defeat. After only one season within the top flight, Li remained with the club as they moved to Zhejiang.

Career statistics 
Statistics accurate as of match played 31 December 2020.

References

External links
 

1991 births
Living people
Chinese footballers
Footballers from Dalian
Zhejiang Yiteng F.C. players
Chinese Super League players
Association football midfielders
China League One players